Festifeel is an annual music festival held to raise money for breast cancer awareness. The festival is organised by the English breast cancer charity CoppaFeel. It describes itself as "Britain's only boutique music festival with boobs in mind".

History

2014

Festifeel 2014 took place at the London Fields Brewery on 21 June 2014. Fearne Cotton was once again the festival's curator.

2013

Festifeel 2013 took place on 15 June at the Islington Metal Works, London. Fearne Cotton was the festival's curator. Huffington Post listed Festifeel as one of their 'Gigs to look out for' during 2013.

2012

In 2012 the festival was held on 4 June at the Queen of Hoxton, Shoreditch and curated by Fearne Cotton. The View were headlining.

2011

On 1 May 2011 Noah and the Whale headlined the festival at Monto Water Rats in King Cross.

2010

On 2 May 2010 Newton Faulkner headlined the festival at Monto Water Rats in King Cross.

References

External links

Music festivals in London
Charity events in the United Kingdom